"Rockstar" is the fifth U.S. single by the Canadian rock band Nickelback from their fifth album, All the Right Reasons (2005). It was initially only released in the United States and Canada, and has since been re-released worldwide. The lyrics feature the hopes of someone who desires to be a rockstar. Spoken-word vocals between each verse are provided by Billy Gibbons of ZZ Top.

"Rockstar" is one of Nickelback's most popular singles to date, peaking at number two in the United Kingdom (their highest-charting single in that country) and being certified Platinum. It has also sold 4.5 million copies in the United States.

Composition
According to the sheet music published at Musicnotes.com by Alfred Publishing, the song is written in the key of G major and is set in time signature of common time with a tempo of 76 beats per minute.

Lawsuits 
In May 2020, Kirk Johnston, the guitarist for Texas rock band Snowblind Revival, sued Nickelback over the song's composition, which he believes is too similar to the Snowblind Revival song "Rock Star". In August 2021, Johnston filed a lawsuit against Nickelback, Warner/Chappell Music, Roadrunner Records, and Live Nation for copyright infringement.

Critical reception
Rolling Stone ranked "Rockstar" at number 100 in their list of the 100 best songs of 2007. Aside from its praise from Rolling Stone and popularity, some have even labelled it one of the worst songs of all time. "Rockstar" was listed at number 2 in BuzzFeed's list of the 30 worst songs ever written The Guardians Peter Robinson claimed that the song was "...a Smack the Pony skit without the laughter track; ironic, given that Rockstar is one of the most unintentionally hilarious songs of the last few years. It is also one of most confusing."

Sea shanty version
As part of the January 2021 surge in popularity of the sea shanty form, the British Indie group The Lottery Winners produced a sea shanty version of "Rockstar" via the TikTok app; Nickelback subsequently collaborated with The Lottery Winners to release a full-length shanty version.

Chart performance
During the song's original release, "Far Away" was more successful on the Billboard Hot 100 and U.S. pop charts, while "Rockstar" instead found moderate success on the rock charts. It peaked at number four on the Mainstream Rock Tracks chart, and number 37 on the Modern Rock Tracks chart. It entered the Billboard Hot 100, peaking at number 54, during its original run.

The song was re-shipped to radio for ads on 5 June 2007, and a video was made to accompany the re-release. After its re-release, became active on most charts again, reaching new peaks on numerous charts like the Hot 100, the Adult Top 40, and Pop 100. It re-entered the Billboard Hot 100 at number forty-seven on week ending date July 7, 2007. It also registered on charts it had previously failed to do on first release, such as the Pop 100 Airplay. "Rockstar" is now the band's best selling digital single to date in the United States, with digital sales there at 4,229,000 as of July 2013.  

On September 12, 2007, "Rockstar" reached a new peak of number six on the Billboard Hot 100, faring better than "Far Away". It became Nickelback's third Top 10 hit from All the Right Reasons, and their fifth career Top Ten on the Hot 100 overall.  "Rockstar" reached its 3,000,000 downloads mark in the U.S. in May 2009 and became the best selling rock single of the 21st century before "How You Remind Me".  

It reached 4 million in sales in the U.S. in June 2012, making it the band's best selling hit in that country. As of January 2015, the song has sold 4.5 million copies in the US.

"Rockstar" was a major success in the United Kingdom, where it peaked at number two on the UK Singles Chart and number one on the UK Singles Downloads Chart, becoming the most successful single overall of Nickelback's career in Britain. The song was released in physical form there after becoming popular online and climbing into the top 50 on downloads alone. Over two years after the release of All the Right Reasons, it became the band's biggest hit in the country, selling 587,000 copies. "Rockstar" debuted on the UK Singles Chart on October 21, 2007 ― week ending date October 27, 2007 ― and lasted almost nine months on the chart. 

On August 10, 2008 ― week ending date August 16, 2008 ― the song re-entered the chart. The release of "Rockstar" also helped All the Right Reasons achieve a top 10 position in the UK Albums Chart for the first time, becoming their third top 10 album there. It also pushed sales of the album there from under 200,000 to over half a million. It became the United Kingdom's fifth biggest selling single of 2008. In August 2008, the song re-entered the top 40 of the UK Singles Chart at number 27, and stayed there for an extra four weeks, taking its total of weeks in the top 40 up to 35. The song remained on the chart for 50 consecutive weeks, before falling off in October 2008.

Music video

When the song was first released in August 2006, a music video was not made for the single. Dori Oskowitz, who directed the band's "If Everyone Cared" video, returned to direct the music video for the song's re-release.

The video features celebrities and anonymous people lip synching to the lyrics. The non-celebrities are filmed around the world, in front of iconic landmarks, such as Times Square, the Flatiron Building and Grand Central Station in New York, Millennium Park and the Buckingham Fountain in Chicago, Playboy Mansion in Los Angeles, St Pauls and Tower Bridge in London, the Opera House and Harbour Bridge in Sydney, and the Brandenburger Tor and Reichstag in Berlin. 

On-screen celebrities include Billy Gibbons (who voices his lines in the song), Chuck "The Iceman" Liddell, Cindy Taylor, Dale Earnhardt Jr., Eliza Dushku, Dominique Swain, Gene Simmons, Wayne Gretzky, Big & Rich's John Rich, the cast of The Girls Next Door, Tom Petkos, Kid Rock, Stacey Travis, Lupe Fiasco, Twista, Nelly Furtado, the crew from American Chopper, Paul Wall, Ted Nugent, Grant Hill, Taryn Manning, Lindsey Shaw, Riki Lindhome, Federico Castelluccio, Liam Lynch, Jordan Carlos, the Naked Cowboy, Three 6 Mafia and numerous others. Sometimes the lyric they are lip synching relates to themselves. At the end of the video Nickelback is shown playing live on stage; this shot was filmed on July 13, 2007, at the Comcast Center for the Performing Arts in Mansfield, Massachusetts.

Track listings and formats
 AUS Maxi CD Single
 "Rockstar" (Radio Edit) – 4:15
 "Never Again" (Live in Atlanta) – 4:16
 "Leader of Men"  – 3:29

 EU Maxi CD Single
 "Rockstar" (Radio Edit) – 4:15
 "Never Again" (Live in Atlanta) – 4:16
 "Photograph" (Live in Atlanta) – 4:38

Credits and personnel
 Chad Kroeger – vocals, guitars, producer
 Mike Kroeger – bass, producer
 Ryan Peake – guitar, vocals, producer
 Daniel Adair – drums, vocals, producer
 Joey Moi – producer
 Randy Staub – mixing

Credits and personnel adapted from "Rockstar" CD single liner notes.

Charts

Weekly charts

Year-end charts

Decade-end charts

Certifications and sales

Release history

References

External links
 Rockstar Lyrics at Nickelback's official site
Official video
Official video - sea shanty version

2006 singles
2006 songs
2007 singles
2008 singles
Body image in popular culture
Nickelback songs
Roadrunner Records singles
Songs about fame
Songs about the media
Songs written by Chad Kroeger
Songs written by Daniel Adair
Songs written by Mike Kroeger
Songs written by Ryan Peake
Song recordings produced by Joey Moi
Country rock songs